The Aplochitonidae are a family of ray-finned fish that are found in the western Pacific and Indian Ocean, mostly in the Indonesian and Australian regions. They are also commonly known as the velvetfishes.

References